The University of Karachi (informally Karachi University, KU, or UoK) is a public research university located in Karachi, Sindh, Pakistan. Established in June 1951 by an act of Parliament and as a successor to the University of Sindh (which is now located in Jamshoro), the university is a "Sindh Government University" and designed by Mohsin Baig as its chief architect.

With a total student body of 41,000 full-time students and a campus size spanning over 1200 acres, Karachi University is one of the largest universities in Pakistan with a distinguished reputation for multi-disciplinary research in science and technology, medical, and social sciences.  The university has over 53 Departments and 19 research institutes operating under nine faculties. There are over 893 academics and more than 2500 supporting staff working for the university.

In 2008, the university was named for the first time by THE-QS World University Rankings among the top 600 universities in the world. In 2009, the university was named as one of the top 500 universities in the world, while in 2016 it was ranked among the top 250 in Asia and 701st in the world. In 2019, it was ranked 801st in the world and 251st in Asia. The University of Karachi is a member of the Association of Commonwealth Universities of the United Kingdom.

History 
At the time of establishment of Pakistan as a sovereign state in 1947, the means for higher education and research were negligible and diminished in the country.  Responding to the impending requirement of higher learning, Pakistan Government started establishing educational institutions of higher learning and research and thus underwent rapid modernization under a policy guided by Prime Minister Liaquat Ali Khan.  Its first Vice-chancellor was Dr. ABA Haleem. In 1953 it started its teaching and research activities at two faculties: the Faculty of Arts and the Faculty of Science.

For the first two years, the University of Karachi remained as an examination university for the affiliated colleges. Over the years, the enrollment expanded rapidly. Karachi University first intake was 50 students, the university now has 53 academic departments and 20 Research Centers and Institutes, under faculties of Social Sciences, Science, Islamic Studies, Engineering, Law, Pharmacy, Management and Administrative Sciences and Medicines. The enrollment of regular students at the campus is around 28,000. There are about 1,000 faculty members and more than 3,000 supporting staff.

Past appointed Vice-Chancellors

Campus

The university has about four percent International students who come from 23 different countries in the regions of Central Asia, South Asia, the Middle East (West Asia) and Europe. The university has a high standard of teaching, with many professors being well-known scholars and academics of international repute. In a short span of 40 years, the university has risen to acquire a high status in the field of education in Pakistan as well as in the region.

Academic emphasis
The most prestigious research center of the university is the International Center for Chemical and Biological Sciences which has over 500 students enrolled for PhD in organic chemistry, biochemistry, molecular medicine, genomics, nanotechnology and other fields. The Husein Ebrahim Jamal Research Institute of Chemistry, Dr. Panjwani Center for Molecular Medicine and Drug Development and the Jamil-ur-Rahman Center for Genome Research are an integral part of this multi-disciplinary research center. It was selected as the UNESCO Center of Excellence in 2016. The university's physics and statistics departments are claimed to be well known departments and its research output plays a vital role in the development of science and technology in the country.

Furthermore, the department of mathematical sciences is one of the largest departments in the Faculty of Science, which has a three-floor building consisting of an electronic laboratory for computational mathematics.

The department of architecture has produced award-winning designers, architects and artists, who are making their mark in the professional world.

Library system

The University of Karachi's library, known as "Dr. Mahmud Hussain Library", has houses well over 400,000 volumes dating back to the 1600s, for researchers as well as for use by students of advance studies and faculty members.  The library became the depository of the personal book collection of Muhammad Ali Jinnah, the founder of Pakistan. Established and constructed in 1952, the Dr. Mahmud Hussain Library is an imposing five story and basement structure firmly placed in the center of campus activities.  Teachers from over 100 affiliated colleges frequent the university, along with scholars from 19 research institutions. A loan and resource sharing system exists with other academic entities in the Karachi area. A digital library enables the scholars and students to access online books and journals. 25 librarians, 10 assistant librarians and around 90 nonprofessional staff help maintain the library. The building includes six reading rooms for general purposes and six for research. The International Centre for Chemical and Biological Sciences has within it the Latif Ebrahim Jamal Science Information Centre which is the national focal point for distance education

Previously called the Karachi University Library, it was renamed the Dr. Mahmud Hussain Library by unanimous resolution of the Karachi University Syndicate on 12 April 1976— the first death anniversary of Prof. Dr. Mahmud Hussain Khan. Mahmud Hussain served the university's Vice-Chancellor from 1971 to 1975 and the library was named in recognition of his contribution to the teaching of social sciences in Pakistan. Dr. Hussain was the first professor the university appointed to its faculty of International Relations and History. He introduced library science to Pakistan by instituting the Faculty of Journalism and Library Science at the university. He also actively worked to improve the status and pay scales of the library staff to make them at par with the university's other faculty members. The photos show that UoK remains seriously underfunded.

Karachi University Press 
The university publishes books, texts, periodicals and other academic materials in-house through the Bureau of Composition, Compilation and Translation (BCC&T).

Faculties and departments
The University of Karachi has 9 faculties:

Research institutes and centres

Alumnus and people 

Since its establishment in 1951, the university has attracted prominent scholars and renowned educationist as its faculty members, researchers and associated scholars. Scholars and educationists such as Ravindra Kaushik, Iqbal Hussain Qureshi, Rafiuddin Raz, Mahmud Hussain, Saleemuzzaman Siddiqui, Abdul Qadeer Khan, I H Qureshi, Raziuddin Siddiqui, Atta-ur-Rahman, Mahreen Asif Zuberi, Prof.Khursheed Ahmed, Bina Shaheen Siddiqui are some of those, that have been affiliated with the institution. The faculty was drawn not only from Pakistan but also included eminent educationists from the United Kingdom and the United States. A visit has been made by English Higher Education Leader Chris Husbands to begin collaborative awarding.

Gallery

Incidents 

On, April 26, 2022, four people including three Chinese nationals, were killed and four others were injured in a suicide attack outside the Confucius Institute located within the University of Karachi. A female suicide bomber was spotted in the attack footage, who was sent by a militant separatist group BLA Baloch Liberation Army operating from Balochistan.

See also

 List of universities in Karachi
 List of universities in Pakistan
 Pakistan Educational Research Network

References

External links
 UoK official website

 
Educational institutions established in 1951
Public universities and colleges in Sindh
1951 establishments in Pakistan
Engineering universities and colleges in Pakistan